Temecula Creek, formerly known as the Temecula River, runs  through southern Riverside County, California, United States, past the rural communities of Radec and Aguanga, and ending  southeast of the original city center of Temecula. The creek is filled with boulders and is typically dry and sandy. It is a relatively undeveloped coastal-draining watershed. Until the 1920s, water flowed in Temecula Creek year-round.

History
A Luiseño Indian rancheria named Temeca or Temeko was named as early as 1785. In 1828 Temecula became the name of a rancho of Mission San Luis Rey. Alfred Kroeber noted that the name may be derived from the Luiseño word temet meaning "sun". The village of Temecula originated on a bluff on the south bank of Temecula Creek opposite the old Wolf's Store according to an 1853 survey.

Today the lake is a public recreational use area.

Watershed
Temecula Creek originates on the north slope of Aguanga Mountain, flows northeast  to Dodge Valley, where it continues northwest through Dodge Valley, Oak Grove Valley, Dameron Valley, Aguanga Valley, Radec Valley, Butterfield Valley, into Vail Lake Reservoir, after which it flows southwest through Pauba Valley to Temecula Valley where it joins Murrieta Creek. Temecula Creek has a slightly larger drainage area than Murrieta Creek.  The Santa Margarita River begins at the confluence of the two creeks at the head of Temecula Canyon.

With the encroachment of homes on both sides of Temecula Creek, portions may be channelized.

Tributaries of Temecula Creek
 Pechanga Creek
 Vail Lake Dam, Vail Lake
 Kolb Creek
 Arroyo Seco Creek
 Wilson Creek
 Cahuilla Creek
 Hamilton Creek (Cahuilla Creek)
 Long Canyon Creek
 Cottonwood Creek
 Tule Creek
 Chihuahua Creek
 Rattlesnake Creek
 Kohler Canyon

Ecology
Biologically diverse, supporting both coastal and desert fauna and flora, it is bounded by the Agua Tibia Wilderness area and the Cleveland National Forest.  The creek supports coastal sage scrub, including Jojoba, alluvial fan scrub, mesquite bosque mix, coast live oak woodland, and mature Fremont cottonwood-willow woodland.

In addition to riparian breeders, birds include least Bell's vireo, Nuttall's quail, ladder-backed woodpecker, and California and Gambel's quail.  Arroyo southwestern toad are also found in Temecula Creek.

North American beaver (Castor canadensis) may gradually raise the water table and return portions of the stream to perennial flow at sitei such as its confluence with Murrieta Creek. However, cattle grazing along Temecula Creek have injured its understory.

References

Rivers of Riverside County, California
Washes of California
Cleveland National Forest
Temecula, California